Sainte-Marie is a commune in the French overseas department of Réunion. It is located on the north side of the island of Réunion, just east of, and adjacent to, the capital of Saint-Denis.

Geography

Climate

Sainte-Marie has a tropical monsoon climate (Köppen climate classification Am) closely bordering on a tropical savanna climate (Aw).

Population

Transport & Economy 

Reunion's main airport and the Air Austral headquarters are located in Sainte-Marie. 
There is also a small fishing harbour, a shopping-center and a brewery in the commune.

Sister cities
  Moka Flacq, (Mauritius), since 1992

See also

Communes of the Réunion department

References

External links
Official website (in French)

Communes of Réunion